Scotia Future is a political party in Scotland which supports Scottish independence. The party is in favour of what it considers "Real Independence and a Scotland of Equals" outside both the United Kingdom and the European Union with a Swiss style relationship within EFTA. On social and economic issues, the Party looks to an older radical nationalist tradition in Scotland than the Scottish National Party (SNP), such as to the economic radicalism of the Scots National League, the Co-operative Movement, and the Highland Land League. Its colours are purple and white, and its logo is a triquetra superimposed on a map of Scotland.

History
Scotia Future was founded on 9 September 2020 by former SNP MSP Chic Brodie. It was registered by the Electoral Commission the same day.

On 22 October 2020, Cllr Andy Doig became Scotia Future's first elected representative when he defected to the party while sitting on Renfrewshire Council for the Johnstone North, Kilbarchan, Howwood and Lochwinnoch ward, having been elected as an independent. He had been both an SNP representative and an independent, but the party to date has decided not to contest elections to either Westminster or local government, but only to contest Holyrood elections, so Cllr Doig retains his Independent status on Renfrewshire Council. In February 2021 Chic Brodie announced his candidacy on behalf of Scotia Future to stand in Ayr constituency at that year's Scottish elections, and Cllr Doig announced his candidacy on behalf of Scotia Future to stand in Renfrewshire South constituency also.

Brodie died on 24 September 2022 following a short illness. Three days later, it was announced that the party would continue in spite of Brodie's death.

Manifesto launch and policies 
Scotia Future launched its Holyrood manifesto on 4 April 2021. It stated that the focus of the election should be on "policies not personalities" which may have been an oblique reference to the very personal contest at that election between the SNP led by Nicola Sturgeon and the newly created Alba Party led by Alex Salmond. The Manifesto called for a programme of more residential rehab centres to treat alcoholism, a strategy to repopulate the Highlands and Islands, a post-independence referendum on the monarchy, a second revising Scottish Senate based in Edinburgh and a House of Representatives based in Glasgow, the introduction of single transferable voting to Holyrood, the decentralisation of local government, and a commitment to repatriating all employment law to Holyrood and the introduction of employee votes and shareholding in every company above a certain size, as in Germany.

Electoral performance

Scottish Parliament

References

2020 establishments in Scotland
Political parties established in 2020
Scottish independence
Political parties in Scotland